Indy Regency Racing was a racing team owned by Sal Incandela who had worked with several Formula One and CART teams.

Team history
The team made its debut at the Mid-Ohio round of the 1991 Indy Lights championship, with David Kudrave as its driver, and contested the entire Indy Lights series for 1992 (again with Kudrave). In 1993 the team made its move to the CART Championship Car series by fielding a car in the 1993 Indianapolis 500 for F1 veteran Olivier Grouillard.  The team's first race that year was to be the Indianapolis 500, however, the car failed to make the field for the "500" but Grouillard participated in 11 races that season for the team.  In 1994 the team signed 1990 Indy 500 champion Arie Luyendyk who had been let go by Chip Ganassi Racing. Luyendyk got the team into its first Indy 500 with 8th on the grid but was knocked out by an engine failure 11 laps from the finish. Luyendyk also finished 17th in points in 1994 with a runner up finish at the Michigan International Speedway. In 1995 the team only ran Indy Lights except for an unsuccessful attempt to qualify for the 1995 Indianapolis 500 with driver Franck Freon.

The team returned to the Indy 500 in 2000 with an entry for Johnny Unser who started 30th and finished 22nd in the team's first Indy Racing League race. They returned the following year with inexperienced rookie Cory Witherill who made an improbably successful bump day run to get the Regency machine into its 3rd Indy 500. Witherill brought the car home in 19th position. In 2002 Regency fielded a car for Hideki Noda in the last 3 races of the season with little success. The team participated in Toyota Atlantic in 2002 after Indy Lights' demise and apparently shut down shortly thereafter.

Drivers

CART
 Franck Fréon (1994)
 Olivier Grouillard (1993)
 Arie Luyendyk (1994)

IRL
 Hideki Noda (2002)
 Johnny Unser (2000)
 Cory Witherill (2001)

Racing results

Complete CART Indy Car World Series results 
(key)

Complete Indy Racing League results
(key)

References

1991 establishments in the United States
2002 disestablishments in the United States
Champ Car teams
IndyCar Series teams
American auto racing teams
Indy Lights teams